William Fawkener may refer to 
William Fawkener (merchant) (1642–1716) was a leading member of the Levant Company, father of Sir Everard Fawkener and the banker.  
William Fawkener (banker), Governor of the Bank of England (1743–1745)
William Augustus Fawkener (c. 1750 – 1811), clerk to the Privy Council and diplomat